Gamini Abhaya Iriyagolla (known as Gamini Iriyagolla) (c.1936-2003) was a Sri Lankan lawyer, civil servant, diplomat and a writer. He was a former member of the Ceylon Civil Service and served as Presidential adviser for Ranasinghe Premadasa.

Born to I. M. R. A. Iriyagolla and Ranee Iriyagolle Menike, he had four siblings. His father I. M. R. A. Iriyagolla would later become Cabinet Minister of Education and Cultural Affairs. Educated at the Royal College, Colombo, where he won the Turnour Prize, edited the college magazine. At seventeen he entered the Law Faculty of University of Ceylon after gaining first in the University Entrance Exam. By the age 22 he was the youngest advocate in the island. 

Iriyagolla entered the Ceylon Civil Service (CCS) at the age of twenty four having become first at the Civil Service Examination. During his service in the CCS, he attended University of Cambridge for postgraduate study and served in the Ministry of Agriculture & Food as Deputy Director of Agricultural Development; Co-Director of the Agrarian Research & Training Institute (ARTI); Senior Assistant Secretary, Ministry of Agriculture & Lands.   

Following his retirement from the Sri Lanka Administrative Service he served as Presidential adviser for President Ranasinghe Premadasa. He authored several books and was a regular contributor to several newspapers.

He died on 3 February 2003 with the final rites taking place at the Colombo General Cemetery. He was married to his wife Indrani, with whom he had two children Nayani and Rohan.

Publications
 Tamil Homeland - Truth or Fiction
 The Kandyan Convention 
 Ceylon History.

References

External links
Vignettes of the Public Service
Gamini Iriyagolla: True patriot and social reformer
Patriot and Visionary In Commemoration Demise 03-01-2003
 Versatile constitutional lawyer

Sinhalese lawyers
Ceylonese advocates
Alumni of Royal College, Colombo
Alumni of the University of Ceylon
Alumni of the University of Cambridge
Sinhalese civil servants
2003 deaths
Year of birth missing